The Ambassador of the United Kingdom to Algeria is the United Kingdom's foremost diplomatic representative to the People's Democratic Republic of Algeria, and head of the UK's diplomatic mission in Algiers.

Ambassadors

1962–1964: Trefor Evans
1964–1965: Sir Thomas Bromley
1965–1968: No representation
1968–1971: Martin Le Quesne  
1971–1973: Ronnald Burroughs
1974–1977: John Robinson
1977–1981: Richard Faber
1981–1984: Benjamin Strachan
1984–1987: Sir Alan Munro
1987–1989: Patrick Eyers
1990–1994: Christopher Battiscombe
1994–1995: Christopher Crabbie
1995–1996: Peter Marshall
1996–1999: Francois Gordon
1999–2001: William Sinton
2001–2002: Richard Edis
2002–2004: Graham Hand
2004–2005: Brian Edward Stewart
2005–2007: Andrew Tesoriere
2007–2010: Andrew Henderson
2010–2014: Martyn Roper
2014–2017: Andrew Noble

2021–: Sharon Wardle

References

External links
UK and Algeria, gov.uk

Algeria
 
United Kingdom